Theodor Junker (April 13, 1919 in Teremia Mare, Timiș County, Romania - April 14, 2013 Burlington, Wisconsin) was a Romanian-born German who generated publicity and controversy when he announced plans to open a memorial to Adolf Hitler in Walworth County, Wisconsin, near Millard, Wisconsin.

Junker had planned to hold a grand opening for the memorial on June 25, 2006. Officials of Walworth County asked him to cancel those plans, citing threats of retaliation, the lack of parking at the site, and Junker's lack of necessary permits, according to an Associated Press report.  Junker voluntarily agreed to not open the site.

Junker's plans were first reported in a story by Donna Lenz Wright published in The Walworth County Week on June 11, 2006. followed by the Milwaukee Journal Sentinel, the Chicago Tribune*, the Los Angeles Times, the New York Times and newspapers throughout Europe.

Junker told her, however, that he would still allow individuals to visit the shrine. "On your property, you can invite anybody you want," he told the Tribune.

Junker had built the shrine in the side of a hill on his property, according to Wright. The top of the building features a marble memorial honoring the Germans killed (both women and children) by the allies in POW camps set up by the U.S. and Russia during World War II. Ironically incongruous tributes to Hitler and to the First Amendment of the U.S. Constitution had been assembled on the walls. The interior contained a National Socialist flag, a United States flag, and two portraits of Hitler, according to Wright's report. Junker told Wright he spent $350,000 on the shrine.

Wright described the shrine as a white concrete structure built into the side of a hill, reachable down a narrow dirt path that is nearly a mile from the nearest road. It is on a section of land with a pond and many trees. The building is built into the side of a hill and has a set of stairs taking you up to a landing on the roof. Atop is the monument to all of the Axis forces. Inside the building are large bookshelves and a large conference table, along with the pictures of Adolf Hitler.

Junker told The Week he volunteered for the 5th SS Panzer Division Wiking in 1940 and served on the Russian front.  He emigrated from Germany to the United States in 1955 and initially worked in Chicago as a janitor. In 1963 he bought a  farm in Walworth County.

References

External links
 Ted Junker Web site: 

1919 births
2013 deaths
American neo-Nazis
Waffen-SS personnel
People from Timiș County
Danube-Swabian people
Romanian people of German descent
Romanian emigrants to the United States
People from Burlington, Wisconsin